The 2019 TruNorth Global 250 was a NASCAR Gander Outdoors Truck Series race held on March 23, 2019, at Martinsville Speedway in Ridgeway, Virginia. Contested over 250 laps on the .526 mile (.847 km) paperclip-shaped short track, it was the fourth race of the 2019 NASCAR Gander Outdoors Truck Series season. This was also Travis Kvapil's last start of his NASCAR career.

Entry list

Practice

First practice

Final practice

Qualifying

Qualifying results

Race

Stage Results

Stage One
Laps: 70

Stage Two
Laps: 70

Final Stage Results

Stage Three
Laps: 110

References

2019 in sports in Virginia
Alpha Energy Solutions 250
NASCAR races at Martinsville Speedway